Pituophis deppei, commonly known as the Mexican bullsnake and the Mexican pine snake, is a species of nonvenomous colubrid snake  endemic to Mexico. There are two recognized subspecies.

Etymology
The specific name, deppei, is in honor of German artist Ferdinand Deppe, who collected natural history specimens in Mexico. 

The subspecific name, jani, is in honor of Italian herpetologist Giorgio Jan.

Geographic range
P. deppei occurs in the Mexican states of Aguascalientes, Coahuila, Guanajuato, Hidalgo, Jalisco, Mexico, Morelos, Nayarit, Nuevo León, Oaxaca, Puebla, Querétaro, San Luis Potosí, Sinaloa, Sonora, and Tamaulipas.

Habitat
The preferred natural habitats of P. deppei are forest, shrubland, and grassland, but it is also found in agricultural, suburban, and urban areas.

Description
Dorsally, P. deppei is yellowish tan, with a series of large quadrangular blotches, which are dark brown to black. It has smaller dark spots on the sides. Ventrally, it is yellowish, with squarish brown spots.

Reproduction
P. deppei is oviparous.

Subspecies
Two subspecies are recognized as being valid, including the nominotypical subspecies.
Pituophis deppei deppei  – southern Mexican pine snake
Pituophis deppei jani  – northern Mexican pine snake

References

Further reading
Duellman WE (1960). "A Taxonomic Study of the Middle American Snake, Pituophis deppei ". University of Kansas Publications, Museum of Natural History 10 (10): 599–610.
Duméril [AMC] (1853). "Prodrome de la classification des reptiles ophidiens ". Mémoires de l'Académie des Sciences, Paris 23: 399–536. (Elaphis deppei, new species, p. 453). (in French).
Duméril A-M-C, Bibron G, Dumeril A[-H-A] (1854). Erpétologie génerale ou histoire naturelle complète des reptiles. Tome septième [Volume 7]. Première partie. Comprenant l'Histoire des serpents non venimeux. Paris: Roret. xvi + 780 pp. (Elaphis deppei, p. 268). (in French).
Heimes P (2016). Snakes of Mexico: Herpetofauna Mexicana Vol. I. Frankfurt am Main, Germany: Chimaira. 572 pp. .

Colubrids
Snakes of North America
Endemic reptiles of Mexico
Reptiles described in 1853
Taxa named by André Marie Constant Duméril